The Lolly-Madonna War is a 1969 novel by American writer  Sue Grafton.  This is the fifth novel Grafton wrote but the second one published.  A work of mainstream fiction, this novel was published by Peter Owen Publishers when Grafton was 29 years old. This is one of only two Sue Grafton novels published before her  "Alphabet" series of mystery novels.  The novel was originally published in the United Kingdom and never saw publication in the United States.

Film adaptation
The novel was adapted into the 1973 motion picture Lolly-Madonna XXX directed by Richard C. Sarafian.  The screenplay was co-written by Rodney Carr-Smith and Sue Grafton.  The film stars Rod Steiger as "Laban Feather", Robert Ryan as "Pap Gutshall", Jeff Bridges as "Zack Feather", Season Hubley as "Roonie Gill", Randy Quaid as "Finch Feather", and Gary Busey as "Zeb".

References

Novels by Sue Grafton
1969 American novels
American novels adapted into films
Peter Owen Publishers books